Tribhuvandas Purushottamdas Luhar, better known by his pen name Sundaram, (22 March 1908 – 13 January 1991), was a Gujarati poet and author from India.

Life

He was born on 22 March 1908 at Miyan Matar, Bharuch, Bombay Presidency, British India. He completed his primary education in local school of Matar and five grades in English medium at Amod, Gujarat. Later he studied at Chhotubhai Purani's Rashtriya New English School, Bharuch. He graduated in languages from Gujarat Vidyapith, Ahmedabad in 1929. He started teaching in Gurukul at Songadh. He participated in Indian independence movement and was imprisoned for some time. He was associated with Jyotisangh, the women's organisation in Ahmedabad, from 1935 to 1945. He was introduced to Sri Aurobindo in 1945, and he moved to Pondicherry. He presided over Gujarati Sahitya Parishad in 1970. He died on 13 January 1991.

Works
Though he started with poetry, he successfully ventured into other field of literature. His poetry and prose both are imaginative, intense and full of brilliance. His works have also spiritual as well as social elements. His transition from different philosophical phases; progressivism, communism, Gandhian philosophy and self realisation philosophy of Aurobindo; are evident in his works.

Poetry
He started writing poetry in 1926 under pen name, Marichi and "Ekansh De" was his first poem followed by more poems under pen name, Vishwakarma. He published his poem Bardoline in 1928 under pen name, Sundaram and adopted it for lifetime.

Koya Bhagatni Kadvi Vaani ane Garibo na Geeto ( Bitter tongue of Koya Bhagat and Songs of the Poor) (1933) was his first poetry collection followed by Kavyamangala ( Auspicious Poems) (1933). He published another collection Vasudha (1939) and the collection of children's poetry, Rang Rang Vadaliya (1939). His Yatra ( The Journey) (1951) is influenced by the philosophy of Aurobindo.

Short stories
Under pen name, Trishul, he published the short story collections. They are Hirakani ane Bijee Vatu (1938), Piyasi (1940), Unnayan (1945, republished Kholki and Nagarika with more stories), Tarini (1978), Pavakna Panthe  (1978).

Criticism
Arvachin Kavita (1946) is a literary criticism of Gujarati poetry from 1845 to 1945. Avalokana is his another work of criticism while Sahitya Chintan (1978) is a collection of articles on principles of literary criticism.

Other
Vasanti Poornima (1977) is a collection of one-act plays. Dakshinayan (1942) is a travelogue of his travel of South India. Chidambara is his memoir while Samarchana is an anthology of articles about his view of life. He also wrote Saavidya (1978). Sri Arvind Mahayogi (1950) is a short biography of Sri Aurobindo. He translated several Sanskrit, Hindi and English works into Gujarati. They include Bhagvajjukiyam (1940), Mṛcchakatika (1944), Kaya Palat (1961), Janata ane Jan (1965), Aisi hai Zindagi ane some writings of Aurobindo and The Mother.

He edited the magazines Dakshina and Baldakshina published by Sri Aurobindo Ashram.

Awards

He was awarded Ranjitram Suvarna Chandrak in 1934 for Kavyamangala.  He received Narmad Gold Medal in 1955 for his poetry collection Yatra and Mahida Prize in 1946 for criticism. He received Sahitya Akademi Award for Gujarati writers in 1968 for his work of criticism, Avalokan. He was awarded Padma Bhushan, the third-highest civilian award, in 1985.

Further reading

See also
 List of Gujarati-language writers

References

External links
 

Recipients of the Padma Bhushan in literature & education
Gujarati-language poets
1908 births
1991 deaths
Gujarati-language writers
Indian literary critics
Recipients of the Sahitya Akademi Award in Gujarati
Sri Aurobindo
20th-century Indian poets
Indian male poets
Poets from Gujarat
Recipients of the Ranjitram Suvarna Chandrak
20th-century translators